Xie Fei may refer to:

Xie Fei (inventor), scholar in Later Zhao Jie Huns state, made a south-pointing carriage c. 340
Xie Fei (revolutionary) (1913–2013), Chinese revolutionary, participant in the Long March, third wife of Liu Shaoqi
Xie Fei (politician) (1932–1999), Chinese politician, former governor of Guangdong
Xie Fei (director) (born 1942), Chinese film director